Isaías Azerman (21 July 1912 – 13 November 1983) was a Chilean footballer who played as a goalkeeper. He appeared in one match for the Chile national football team in 1935. He was also part of Chile's squad for the 1935 South American Championship.

At the club level Azerman played for Audax Italiano, joining them on their 1933 barnstorming tour of South, Central and North America.

Azerman was of Jewish descent.

References

External links
 

1912 births
1983 deaths
Chilean footballers
Chile international footballers
Audax Italiano footballers
Association football goalkeepers
Chilean people of Jewish descent
Footballers from Santiago